Suryadi is a common Javanese name.

Suryadi or Soerjadi may refer to:

Suryadi (judge), former Chief Justice of the Supreme Court of Indonesia
Suryadi (politician) (1939–2016), chairman of the Indonesian Democratic Party 
Linus Suryadi AG (1951–1999), Indonesian writer 
Suryadi Gunawan (born 1966), Indonesian wrestler